Michael Frew (born 15 December 1997) is a Jamaican cricketer. He made his List A debut on 20 January 2015 in the 2014–15 Regional Super50 tournament. In December 2015 he was named in the West Indie's squad for the 2016 Under-19 Cricket World Cup.

References

External links
 

1997 births
Living people
Jamaican cricketers
People from Westmoreland Parish